Tomalio is a 1933 American Pre-Code comedy film directed by Ray McCarey and starring Fatty Arbuckle. It was Arbuckle's last-released film, appearing after his death.

Cast
 Fatty Arbuckle as Wilbur
 Fritz Hubert as Wilbur's pal
 Charles Judels as The General
 Phyllis Holden as Lolita
 Jerry Bergen
 Pierre de Ramey
 Clyde Veaux
 Clarence Rock
 Aristides de Leoni
 John Barclay
 Lew Kessler

See also
 Fatty Arbuckle filmography

External links

1933 films
1933 comedy films
1933 short films
American black-and-white films
Films directed by Ray McCarey
American comedy short films
Films produced by Samuel Sax
Vitaphone short films
Warner Bros. short films
1930s American films